Isaiah (Yeshayahu Hebrew: ישעיהו "Shy") Zeldin (July 11, 1920 – January 26, 2018) was an American rabbi. He was the founder of the Stephen S. Wise Temple, a Reform synagogue in Bel Air, Los Angeles, California.

Early Years and Education
Yiddish was his first language. He was born in Brookyn, the second of three sons born to Movsha Froim "Morris" Zeldin (1891-1976), a pioneer in the Zionist movement and one of the organizers of the United Jewish Appeal of New York, and Esther née Shlyapochnik (1895-1971), both immigrants from Petrikov. Isaiah Zeldin graduated from Brooklyn College in 1941 and worked for the Jewish Education Committee in New York City. He was ordained at Hebrew Union College in Cincinnati, which awarded him its Simon Lazarus Prize for attaining highest academic standing in his graduating class.

Rabbinate
Before he was ordained, he served as rabbi of Temple Israel (Stockton, California). He was appointed assistant rabbi at Temple B'nai Jeshurin, Newark, New Jersey and subsequently the first rabbi of Temple Beth Shalom, Flushing, NY, 1951. In 1953 he became director of the Southern California region of the Union of American Hebrew Congregations and Dean of the Los Angeles College of Jewish Studies. In 1958, he assumed the pulpit at Temple Emanuel (Beverly Hills, California) upon the sudden death of Rabbi Bernard Harrison.

Founds Stephen S. Wise Temple
 In 1964 Zeldin and 35 families broke away from Temple Emanuel to establish a new synagogue in Westwood. The new congregation was named for the influential Reform rabbi Stephen Samuel Wise, under whom Zeldin had studied. The new congregation faced immediate controversy as the Union for Reform Judaism (then called the  Union of American Hebrew Congregations or UAHC) felt that some of its members had failed to honor existing commitments to Temple Emanuel, and the UAHC did not accept it for membership for the first five years of its existence. The new congregation was intended to have a membership limited in size to maintain intimacy between the rabbi and the member families, and it met at St. Alban's Episcopal Church in Westwood.  A year later, the congregation acquired a site for a permanent home; the size limit policy was changed in 1969; and in 1970, Stephen Wise Temple absorbed the existing Westwood Temple, whose membership had been declining, in part due to disruption from the construction of the San Diego Freeway. As of 2010, the congregational database of the Union for Reform Judaism (as the UAHC is now known) stated that Stephen S. Wise Temple had 2,886 members, which was more than any other congregation in the database.

Later Years
In 1990, Rabbi Zeldin retired from his duties as Senior Rabbi and was succeeded by Rabbi Eli Herscher. In 1999, Rabbi Zeldin delivered a prayer at the inauguration of California Gov. Gray Davis. Rabbi Zeldin died in 2018 at age 97.

Books
Isaiah Zeldin. Zeldin's Way: Eighty-Five Stories for Eighty-Five Years. Isaac Nathan Publishing Co (January 1, 2005).
Isaiah Zeldin. What this modern Jew believes. Isaac Nathan Publishing Co (January 1, 1996).
Isaiah Zeldin. Sources of Faith in Times of Crisis as Reflected in Talmudic Literature. Department of Adult Jewish Education, Union of American Hebrew Congregations (1961).
Isaiah Zeldin. The Mumar in the Talmud and Medieval Rabbinic Literature. Hebrew Union College - Jewish Institute of Religion (1946).

External links
Rabbi Zeldin on Stephen S. Wise Temple website
Tribute to Rabbi Isaiah Zeldin on his 97th Birthday
Remarks from Rabbi Isaiah Zeldin On His 90th Birthday
A Passover Visit with Rabbi Isaiah Zeldin

References

1920 births
2018 deaths
People from Brooklyn
People from Bel Air, Los Angeles
People from Palm Desert, California
American Reform rabbis
Brooklyn College alumni
Hebrew Union College – Jewish Institute of Religion alumni
21st-century American Jews